Pellegrino Aretusi (ca. 1460–1523), also known as Pellegrini de Modena and as Pellegrino Munari, was an Italian painter who was born in Modena, Italy.  His early instruction was from his father Giovanni Munari.  About 1509, Pellegrino went to Rome to assist Raphael at the Vatican.  Pellegrino was then commissioned to paint frescos in the Church of St. Eustachio and the Church of St. Giacomo degli Spagnuoli, both in Rome.  He was murdered on 20 November 1523 by relatives of a youth whom his son had killed.

References 
 Davidson, Bernice F., Pellegrino da Modena, The Burlington Magazine, Vol. 112, No. 803, Italian Sixteenth-Century Art outside Venice (Feb., 1970), 78–86.
 Vasari, Giorgio, Le Vite delle più eccellenti pittori, scultori, ed architettori, many editions and translations.

15th-century Italian painters
Italian male painters
16th-century Italian painters
Painters from Modena
Italian Renaissance painters
Italian murder victims
1460 births
1523 deaths